Carol Huston (born August 15, 1959) is an American actress and singer.

Early life
Carol Huston was born in Milwaukee, Wisconsin, and grew up in Des Plaines, Illinois.

Huston attended Forest View High School in nearby Arlington Heights, where she participated in its performing arts program, headed by Dr. Jack Martin and Jerry Swanson. She started her early professional training there as a singer and actress. She attended Wheaton College as a voice major. At the time, she performed throughout Chicago as an actor and singer, most notably at the Goodman Theater. She was a member of the Chicago Sunday Evening Club Chorale, appearing weekly on Chicago's WTTW, a PBS station.

Career

Acting
She is most well known for her roles in the TV series Matlock, The Charmings and Island Son. Huston replaced Caitlin O'Heaney as Snow Charming on The Charmings in 1987.

She appeared in an episode of the TV series Diagnosis: Murder called "Open and Shut", as well as A Very Brady Christmas as Peter Brady's fiancée (and boss), Valerie Thomas.

She appeared with Paul Newman and Tom Cruise in The Color of Money (1986), and with Tom Hanks and Jackie Gleason in Nothing in Common (1986) before relocating permanently to Southern California.

Real estate
Carol left acting in 2000 to become a real estate agent in Los Angeles, California and now owns her own company True Story Realty  for which she has a team of five other Realtors.

Personal life

Carol married Gerald "Jerry" Watts Jr., on July 20, 2003. She has a daughter, Morgan, from a previous relationship. She also has a grandson, Rhys and a granddaughter, Brianne.

Filmography

References

External links

Carol Huston Homepage
Carol Huston's real estate company

Living people
American television actresses
Actresses from Illinois
1963 births
20th-century American actresses
21st-century American women